The 2021 Sefton Metropolitan Borough Council election took place on 6 May 2021 to elect members of Sefton Council in England. This was on the same day as other local elections. One-third of the seats were up for election, with two wards (Blundellsands and Derby) electing two councillors.

Results

Ward results

Ainsdale

Birkdale

Blundellsands

Cambridge

Church

Derby

Dukes 

The incumbent, Tony Dawson, was elected as a Liberal Democrat but suspended in 2017.

Ford

Harington

Kew

Linacre

Litherland

Manor

Meols

Molyneux

Netherton and Orrell

Norwood

Park

Ravenmeols

St Oswald

Sudell

Victoria

References 

Sefton
Council elections in the Metropolitan Borough of Sefton